National Highway 922 (NH 922) is a  National Highway in India. This highway connects Buxar and Patna (via Arrah) in Bihar.

Route
In Bihar, it is known as the Patna-Arrah-Buxar road. The route of NH-922 from east to west is as follows:

 Patna
 Danapur
 Neura
 Sadisopur
 Bihta
 Koilwar
 Kulharia
 Sakaddi
 Arrah
 Karisath
 Behea
 Shahpur
 Brahmpur
 Dumraon
 Buxar

References

National highways in India
Transport in Patna